Edward Bluemel is an English actor best known for his portrayal of Marcus Whitmore in Sky One's adaptation of A Discovery of Witches (2018), based on the book of the same name by Deborah Harkness. Bluemel was also featured in The Halcyon (2017), The Commuter (2018), Sex Education (2019) and Killing Eve (2019).

Early life and education
He attended Taunton School until 2011, and is an alumnus of the Royal Welsh College of Music & Drama with a BA in Acting.

Filmography

Film

Television

Theatre

Video games

References

External links
 
 
 

Living people
1993 births
Alumni of the Royal Welsh College of Music & Drama
21st-century English male actors
English male film actors
English male stage actors
Place of birth missing (living people)
English male television actors